Czernichów  is a village in Żywiec County, Silesian Voivodeship, in southern Poland. It is the seat of the gmina (administrative district) called Gmina Czernichów.

The village has a population of 1,098.

The village was most probably established in the first half of the 16th century either by Vlachs or Germans.

Czernichów is twinned with:
  Bicester, Oxfordshire in Great Britain

References

Villages in Żywiec County